The Lescot Wing (Aile Lescot in French, also Aile Henri II) is the oldest preserved structure above ground of the Louvre Palace in Paris, France. It was designed by architect Pierre Lescot and built between 1546 and 1551. Its architecture is influenced by Italian Mannerism. It had seminal influence on what became the Parisian Renaissance style, and beyond it, French architectural classicism.

King Francis I appointed architect Pierre Lescot (1510–1578) to lead all building projects at the Louvre Palace. Lescot's role was reconfirmed following Francis’s death by his son and successor Henry II; Lescot kept working on the Louvre project until his death, completing the Lescot Wing in 1551, the Pavillon du Roi, and the western section of the southern wing of the Cour Carrée.

Exterior

The wing's façade on the court side, now the Cour Carrée, consists of two main stories (ground floor and first floor) plus an attic richly decorated with Jean Goujon's bas-relief sculptures. It is crowned by a sloping or Mansard roof, which had considerable influence on the subsequent development of French architecture, including the later work of François Mansart which gave his name to the roof profile. The deeply recessed arch-headed windows of the ground story form an arcade, while the projecting pavilions bear small round oeil de bœuf windows above them. In the second storey slender fluted pilasters separate the windows, which alternate triangular and arched pediments. Goujon's sculpture and architectural ornaments are subordinated to the construction. 

The eastern façade was comprehensively renovated in the early 1980s and inaugurated by President François Mitterrand, together with the rest of the cleaned-up Cour Carrée, on 24 February 1986.

Interior

Both the ground floor and the first floor include major ceremonial spaces or Great Halls that played a significant symbolic and practical role in the operation of the French monarchy for more than a century after their initial construction.

Ground floor

The Lower Great Hall, now known as Hall of the Caryatids, first completed in 1549, replaced what had been the Great Hall of the Medieval Louvre built in the 13th century. The former adjacent chapel's footprint was kept as a semi-separated space on the southern end, known since as the "tribunal", whose floor was originally slightly higher than the rest. On the room's northern end, Goujon created a tribune or minstrels' gallery supported by four caryatid figures inspired by classical precedents (not directly by those of the Erechtheion in Athens, which were not known in Renaissance France, but presumably by ancient Roman copies thereof). The original ceiling, supported by wooden beams, had to be propped up as early as the reign of Henry IV; in 1638, that wooden ceiling was replaced by the current stone vault supported by pillars decorated with columns, designed by Jacques Lemercier. The sculpted decoration thereof was completed around 1806-1808 by Percier and Fontaine, who removed the difference of floor level between the "tribunal" and the rest of the room. The room was used for multiple festivities and ceremonies, including the mourning of King Henry IV from 10 to 26 June 1610, and a ritual foot washing of thirteen paupers performed by Louis XIV on Maundy Thursday.

First floor

In the 18th century, it was partitioned and the various rooms thus created were used by the Academies and other institutions. In 1864, Hector Lefuel renovated the room for museum use, including a skylight in the ceiling, after a new  had been created in Napoleon III's Louvre expansion. During the 1930s, Louvre architect Albert Ferran recreated the attic to expand the Louvre's exhibition spaces and redecorated the room, thus brought back to its 16th-century height and volume, in a stripped Classicism style, keeping Percier and Fontaine's triumphal-arch-shaped structures at both ends of the room and their ample cornice that supported the public's gallery. This setup was complemented in 2010 by a painted ceiling by Cy Twombly that pays homage to great artists of ancient Greece. In 2020-2021, the room was redecorated by government architect Michel Goutal in the spirit of Lefuel's design of the 1860s; that triggered a lawsuit from the Cy Twombly Foundation, even though the painting was left untouched.

To the south of the Upper Great Hall were two rooms leading to the Pavillon du Roi, a wardrobe and an antechamber, which were merged into a single King's antechamber in 1660, where Louis XIV used to dine in public. That room still displays its ornate carved ceiling, the central section of which was originally the ceiling of the 16th-century antechamber and was complemented by two side sections in the same style during the 1660 enlargement. The ceiling reserves three spaces for paintings, which were decorated in 1822 with works by Merry-Joseph Blondel.

Second floor

The attic served as lodgings for high-ranking officials and courtiers until its suppression in the early 19th century. In the 1650s it was inhabited by Cardinal Mazarin's nieces. Since 1993 it has been dedicated to the exhibition of 19th-century French paintings.

Staircases

Its vaulted stone ceiling is decorated with ornate motifs designed by Jean Goujon.

Two smaller spiral staircases also served the Lescot Wing and adjacent Pavillon du Roi. They still exist but are not open to the public.

See also
 Pavillon du Roi
 Cour Carrée

Notes

External links

"Façade of the Cour Carrée (Wing Lescot)" at the Web Gallery of Art.
Lescot Wing webpage at Louvre Website

Louvre Palace
1551 establishments in France